Hyosung Corporation is a South Korean industrial chaebol, founded in 1966. It operates in various fields, including the chemical industry, industrial machinery, IT, trade, and construction. It is known in Korea mostly for high-end apartments and automatic teller machines. Its CEO is Hyun-joon Cho (조현준).

Recently, Hyosung has become known for its technologies related to hydrogen vehicles, such as carbon fiber for the fuel tank and hydrogen charging stations.

See also
Economy of South Korea
List of South Korean companies
Hyosung Motors & Machinery Inc.: Motorcycle manufacturer and automobile parts supplier, spun off from Hyosung Corp. in 1980.

References

 
Chaebol
Real estate companies of South Korea
Manufacturing companies of South Korea
Financial technology companies
Chemical companies of South Korea
Companies based in Seoul
Financial services companies established in 1966
Companies listed on the Korea Exchange
South Korean brands
Pump manufacturers
Auto dealerships